The Irish Mail was a named train in the United Kingdom that operated from London Euston via the West Coast and North Wales Coast lines to Holyhead from 1848 until 2002 connecting with ferry services to Dublin.

History

The first Irish Mail was operated by the London & North Western Railway on 1 August 1848. It was subsequently operated by the London, Midland & Scottish Railway, British Rail, InterCity and Virgin Trains. As the Britannia Bridge had yet to be completed, the first services terminated at Bangor and recommenced at Llanfairpwllgwyngyll. It operated twice daily in each direction, although this was reduced to daily during World War II.

Although notionally an express service, with the electrification of the West Coast Main Line, from the 1960s the service stopped for a locomotive change at Crewe.

Although the service continued to operate, the name was dropped in June 2002 as part of a policy by Virgin Trains not to operate named trains.

Incidents

On 20 August 1868, the Irish Mail collided with some run away freight wagons near Abergele that were loaded with flammable products with 33 fatalities.
On 14 September 1870, the Irish Mail was accidentally diverted into a siding at Tamworth crashing into the River Anker with three fatalities.
On 27 August 1950, the Irish Mail collided with shunting locomotive LMS Hughes Crab No. 42885 near Penmaenmawr station resulting in six fatalities.

Namesake
In 1998, Virgin Trains named Class 43 powercar  43101 The Irish Mail 1848 - 1998 to commemorate the services' 150th anniversary.

See also
 Chester and Holyhead Railway

References

Named passenger trains of the London, Midland and Scottish Railway
Named passenger trains of British Rail
Railway services introduced in 1848
Railway services discontinued in 2002
1848 establishments in the United Kingdom
2002 disestablishments in the United Kingdom